The Denham Roundabout is a road junction in Denham, Buckinghamshire. The westbound A40, flows into the M40 motorway at this point. The roundabout below facilitates junction 1 (J1) of the motorway to connect with the westbound continuation of the A40, together with the intersection of the road from Uxbridge (A4020) and the road from Slough to Watford (A412).

When the M40 from Denham to High Wycombe was built, Western Avenue was extended at high level to make an end-on join with the motorway, and a larger roundabout was built below the bridges carrying the motorway. When first laid out, the roundabout had the traffic going round it clockwise in the usual way, but as traffic volumes built up, the layout was altered so that the traffic moved round the roundabout in both directions, making it a ring junction with roundabouts at the points that other roads join the main roundabout.

See also
 Magic Roundabout (Colchester)
 Magic Roundabout (Hemel Hempstead)
 Magic Roundabout (High Wycombe)
Magic Roundabout (Swindon)

References

External links
 Google Maps satellite image view

Magic roundabouts
Roundabouts in England
Road junctions in England
Transport in Buckinghamshire